The National Piping Centre is an institution in Glasgow, Scotland, dedicated to the playing of the bagpipes, to include not only the Great Highland Bagpipes, but also the Scottish smallpipes and Irish uileann pipes, as well as other traditional musical instruments.

The institution includes practice spaces, an auditorium, and the Museum of Piping.

It is located in the Cowcaddens district of the city, in the former Cowcaddens Free Church. The building is Category B listed.

See also 
 List of music museums

References

External links
Official site

Bagpipe museums
Museums in Glasgow
Music museums in Scotland
Scottish music
Educational organisations based in Scotland
Category B listed buildings in Glasgow
Arts organisations based in Scotland